Stephen Graham Jones (born January 22, 1972) is a Blackfoot Native American author of experimental fiction, horror fiction, crime fiction, and science fiction. He has published "25 or 30 or so books". 31.5 linear feet of works written by or related to him are held in the Sowell Family Collection in Literature, Community, and the Natural World, part of the Southwest Collection/Special Collections Library at Texas Tech University. 

He is currently the Ivena Baldwin professor of English at the University of Colorado Boulder.

Background 
Stephen Graham Jones was born in Midland, Texas, on January 22, 1972 to Dennis Jones and Rebecca Graham. He is an enrolled member of the Blackfeet Tribe of the Blackfeet Indian Reservation of Montana. 

Jones married his wife Nancy on May 20, 1995, and together they have one child.

Jones received his Bachelor of Arts degree in English and Philosophy from Texas Tech University in Lubbock, Texas in 1994. He then went on to earn his Master of Arts degree in English from the University of North Texas in Denton, Texas in 1996. He completed his Ph.D. in 1998 from Florida State University in Tallahassee, Florida.

Writing career 

While he was attending Florida State University, Jones's dissertation director introduced him to Houghton-Mifflin editor Jane Silver at the Writers' Harvest conference. Jones pitched her a novel which he had not yet written, and Silver liked the idea. Jones then wrote the book, The Fast Red Road, as his dissertation. It was published as his debut novel in 2000. It was followed by All the Beautiful Sinners in 2003.

In 2002, Jones won a National Endowment for the Arts fellowship in fiction. In 2006, he won the Jesse Jones Award for Fiction from the Texas Institute of Letters for his 2005 short story collection Bleed Into Me. He won the Bram Stoker Award for Long Fiction for Mapping the Interior in 2017.

The Only Good Indians, a horror novel, was published on July 14, 2020 through Saga Press and Titan Books. It won the Ray Bradbury Prize for Science Fiction, Fantasy & Speculative Fiction in 2020. Jones won two 2020 Bram Stoker Awards for Night of the Mannequins and The Only Good Indians. 

Jones contributed an X-Men story to Marvel Comics' Marvel's Voices: Indigenous Voices #1 anthology, release in November of 2020. Joining him was artist David Cutler.

My Heart is a Chainsaw won the 2021 Bram Stoker Award for Novel.

Themes and style
Jones has acknowledged a debt to Native American Renaissance writers, especially Gerald Vizenor, who wrote the praise for Jones's debut The Fast Red Road. Scholar Cathy Covell Waegner describes his work as containing elements of "dark playfulness, narrative inventiveness, and genre mixture."

Other scholars such as Joseph Gaudet have cited his writing as "post-ironic" or representative of David Foster Wallace's "New Sincerity," a literary approach "emerging in response to the cynicism, detachment, and alienation that many saw as defining the postmodern canon," seeking instead "to more patently embrace morality, sincerity, and an 'ethos of belief.' His eighth novel, Ledfeather, which Jones himself has acknowledged as being the most widely taught of his books, is used as Gaudet's primary example. Mongrels too has been included as an example since its publication in 2016.

Awards

Selected works

Books

Under the pseudonym P. T. Jones

Short stories

 
 

 
 
 
 "Men, Women, and Chainsaws." Tor.com. 2022. ISBN 9781250850874.

Comics
 
 'Dear Final Girls' (2019) art by Jolyon Yates, originally published in the Horror Special issue of 'Wicked Awesome tales' edited by Todd Jones. https://jolyonbyates.com/section/509922-Dear%20Final%20Girls.html

References

Further reading
 Billy J. Stratton, The Fictions of Stephen Graham Jones: A Critical Companion (U of New Mexico P, 2016)

External links

 
 "Exodus" short story by Stephen Graham Jones
"The Night Cyclist" short story by Stephen Graham Jones
"Chapter Six" short story by Stephen Graham Jones
 Reviews by Stephen Graham Jones on IMDb
 
Stephen Graham Jones at the University of Colorado website

1972 births
Living people
21st-century American novelists
American horror writers
American male novelists
American mystery writers
American science fiction writers
Blackfeet Nation people
Florida State University alumni
Native American novelists
Texas Tech University faculty
American male short story writers
21st-century American short story writers
21st-century American male writers
Novelists from Texas
Weird fiction writers